Xi Lan (meaning: "Atlanta's joy") (b. August 30, 2008) is a male giant panda cub currently residing in Chengdu, China at the research Base.  He is the son and second offspring of Lun Lun and Yang Yang. He is the brother of Mei Lan, who was born at Zoo Atlanta in 2006; Po, born at Zoo Atlanta on November 3, 2010; twins Mei Lun and Mei Huan, born at Zoo Atlanta on July 15, 2013; and twins Ya Lun and Xi Lun, born at Zoo Atlanta on September 3, 2016.

Xi Lan was born at Zoo Atlanta on August 30, 2008, and is the only panda cub born in the United States in the year 2008. As with Mei Lan, Zoo Atlanta announced that the public would be able to vote for the cub's name. Twelve selections were made and on December 8, 2008, the winning name, Xi Lan, was unveiled at his 100-day naming ceremony.

Xi Lan made his public debut on December 30, 2008. He returned to China on May 20, 2014 and is living at the Chengdu Panda Base.

References

External links
Zoo Atlanta cub updates

Individual giant pandas
2008 animal births